Brenda Joyce (born c. 1963, New York State) is an American author of romance novels as Brenda Joyce. She also signed a novel as B.D. Joyce.

Biography
Brenda Joyce, a native of New York, wrote her first novella when she was sixteen , and finished her first novel at twenty-five. She sold her novel quickly, and since that first publication in 1988 she has published thirty-four novels.

Her first novel, Innocent Fire, won the Best Western Romance award from the Romance Writers of America. She has also been awarded the Best Historical Romance Award and Romantic Times' Lifetime Achievement Award. There are currently eleven million copies of her novels in print in 12 countries.  Joyce has had success in both the historical and contemporary romance genres.

Family
Joyce is married to an Israeli man who once commanded an anti-terrorist unit in Lebanon. The couple and their son live in Arizona.

Books

The de Warenne Dynasty
The Conqueror (Sep 1990)
Promise of the Rose (Nov 1993)
The Game (Nov 1994)
House of Dreams (Sep 2002)
The Prize (Oct 2004)
The Masquerade (Sep 2005)
The Stolen Bride (Oct 2006)
A Lady at Last (Dec 2006)
The Perfect Bride (July 2007)
A Dangerous Love (2008)
An Impossible Attraction (March 2010)
The Promise (September 2010)

Bragg Saga
Innocent Fire (Jun 1988)
Firestorm (Nov 1988)
Violet Fire (May 1989)
Dark Fires (Jun 1991)
The Darkest Heart (Dec 1989)
Fires of Paradise (Apr 1992)
Scandalous Love  (Nov 1992)
Secrets (Apr 1993) (Bragg/Delanza Series)

The Delanzas
Five Golden Rings (Anthology)
A Gift of Joy (Anthology)
After Innocence
Secrets

Other Historicals
The Rival
Splendor
Captive

St. Georges
Beyond Scandal
The Finer Things

Deadly Series
Deadly Love (January 2001) [Originally as B.D. Joyce]
Deadly Pleasure (March 2002)
Deadly Affairs (April 2002)
Deadly Desire (May 2002)
Deadly Caress (April 2003)
Deadly Promise (November 2003)
Deadly Illusions (February 2005)
Deadly Kisses (February 2006)
Deadly Vows (March 2011)

Master of Time Series
Dark Seduction (May 2007)
Dark Rival (October 2007)
Dark Embrace (September 2008)
Dark Victory (March 2009)
Dark Lover (July 2009)

The Spymasters Men Series
Seduction (January 2012)
Persuasion (August 2012)
Surrender (February 2013)

References

Sources

External links
Official site
Site for the de Warenne Dynasty
Master of Time Books

1960s births
Living people
20th-century American novelists
American romantic fiction novelists
Novelists from New York (state)
21st-century American novelists
American women novelists
Women romantic fiction writers
20th-century American women writers
21st-century American women writers